Morciano di Leuca is a town and comune of 3,121 inhabitants in the province of Lecce, in the Apulia region of south-east Italy.

History

The origins of Morciano di Leuca probably go back to the 9th century AD, with the destruction of the city by the Saracens. In 1190 king Tancred of Sicily gave  Sinibaldo Sambiasi the fief of Morciano, which remained under his  family until the 13th century. Later it was acquired by other barons, including Walter VI of Brienne (1335).

Main sights
Castle, built by order of Walter VI of Brienne in the early 14th century
Mother Church of San Giovanni Elemosiniere (16th century)
Church of the Carmine (c. 1486)
Coastal watchtower of Torre Vado (16th century)

References

Cities and towns in Apulia
Localities of Salento